is a Japanese voice actor from Wakayama, Wakayama. He is affiliated with Ken Production. His debut role was Volfogg/Big Volfogg in GaoGaiGar. He is most well known for portraying Kamina in Gurren Lagann, Laxus Dreyar in Fairy Tail and Tanktop Master in One Punch Man. In the early 2000s until the year 2008 he gave the voice to Ikki of Phoenix in Saint Seiya throughout the Hades Saga. He is also known for voicing two characters, Keigo Asano and Shuhei Hisagi, both from Bleach. He has recently been gaining recognition as Diavolo from JoJo's Bizarre Adventure: Golden Wind, Jonathan Joestar from the Phantom Blood film, and Tengen Uzui from Demon Slayer: Kimetsu no Yaiba.

He was the special guest at the 2010 Anime Expo in Los Angeles, USA, where he met his fans and revealed that his favorite anime character was Kamina from Tengen Toppa Gurren Lagann; also adding that each character whom he voiced is important to him. Konishi was awarded the Best Supporting Actor Award in the 9th Annual Seiyu Awards on March 6, 2015.

Filmography

Television animation

Drama CDs

 7 Seeds, Semimaru Asai
 Diabolik Lovers, Sakamaki Reiji
 Hetalia: Axis Powers, America
 Me & My Brothers, Takeshi Miyashita
 Nurarihyon no Mago: Sennen Makyou Character CD Series (Ryuji Keikain & Akifusa Keikain) Special Drama Track, Ryuji Keikain
 Pandora Hearts, Gilbert Nightray/Raven
 Pyū to Fuku! Jaguar, Hammer
 Sekai-ichi Hatsukoi, Masamune Takano/Saga
 Shin Megami Tensei: Devil Survivor, Kamiya Eiji
 Tales of Symphonia A Long Time Ago, Lloyd Irving
 Tales of Symphonia Rodeo Ride Tour, Lloyd Irving
 High School Debut, Fumiya Tamura
 Only the Ring Finger Knows, Kazuki Shohei

Original video animation (OVA)

Original net animation (ONA)

Theatrical animation

Video games
1999
 The Last Blade, Keiichiro Washizuka
 Captain Love, Kumon Serizawa
 The King of Fighters '99, Maxima
2000
 The King of Fighters 2000, Maxima
2001
 The King of Fighters 2001, Maxima
 Goemon: Shin Sedai Shūmei!, Kojiro
2002
 Kaitou Apricot, So Mochizuki
 The King of Fighters 2002, Maxima
2003
 Venus & Braves, Red, Melvin
 Mega Man Network Transmission, BrightMan
 Kin'iro no Corda, Shinobu Osaki
 Tales of Symphonia, Lloyd Irving
 Gakuen Heaven: Boy's Love Scramble, Tetsuya Niwa
 The King of Fighters 2003, Maxima
2004
 Inuyasha: The Secret of the Cursed Mask, Utsugi
 Shaman King: Spirit Funbari, Amidamaru
 Monkey Turn V, Yusuke Enoki
 ZOIDS VS. III, Rasutani
2005
 The Wings of Rean, Captain Kairaku
 The King of Fighters XI, Maxima
2006
 Baten Kaitos II, Fuse
 Shakugan no Shana, Merihimu
 Gunparade Orchestra: Midori no Shou, Shion Ryuzoji
 .hack//G.U., Sakaki
 Gunparade Orchestra: Ao no Shou, Shion Ryuzoji
 Arabians Lost: The Engagement on Desert, Tyrone Vail
 Blood+: One Night Kiss, Haji
 Blood+: Final Piece, Haji
 Summon Night 4, Subaru
 Yoake Mae Yori Ruriiro na: Brighter than Dawning Blue, Sawajin Takami
 Tales of the World: Radiant Mythology, Lloyd Irving
2007
 Saint Seiya: The Hades, Phoenix Ikki
 D.Gray-man: Kami no Shitotachi, Komui Lee
 Eternal Sonata, Crescendo
 Reijou Tantei Office no Jikenbo, Kaijin Mikage
 Tales of Fandom Vol.2, Lloyd Irving
 Shounen Onmyouji: Tsubasa Yoima, Ten e Kaere, Guren
 Gurren Lagann, Kamina
 Assassin's Creed, Altair Ibn La Ahad
 Samurai Warriors 2 Xtreme Legends, Toshiie Maeda
2008
 Your Memories Off: Girl's Style, Kuta
 Mobile Suit Gundam 00, Johann Trinity
 Warriors Orochi 2, Toshiie Maeda
 Tales of Symphonia: Dawn of the New World, Lloyd Irving
 Zero: Tsukihami no Kamen, Choshiro Kirishima
 D.Gray-man: Sousha no Shikaku, Komui Lee
 Macross Ace Frontier, Ozuma Lee
 Mobile Suit Gundam 00 Gundam Meisters
 Monochrome Factor Cross Road, Ko
 Blazer Drive, Jonathan
 Suikoden Tierkreis, Dirk
 Togainu no Chi: True Blood, Kiriwari
 Fushigi Yūgi: Suzaku Ibun, Hotohori
2009
 Tales of the World: Radiant Mythology 2, Lloyd Irving
 Killzone 2, Thomas Cebu Sebuchenko
 Bamboo Blade: Sorekara no Chousen, Toraji Ishida
 Arc Rise Fantasia, Sage
 Tales of VS., Lloyd Irving
 Ookamikakushi, Miyuki Washuu
 Macross Ultimate Frontier, Ozuma Lee
 Dragon Ball Raging Blast, Ginyu
 Warriors Orochi Z, Toshiie Maeda
 Samurai Warriors 3, Toshiie Maeda
 Initial D Arcade Stage 5, Hideo Minagawa
2010
 Kin'iro no Corda 3, Shinobu Osaki
 Fist of the North Star: Ken's Rage, Kenshiro
 No More Heroes: Heroes' Paradise, Henry
 The King of Fighters XIII, Maxima
 GA: Geijutsuka Art Design Class -Slapstick Wonderland-, Uozumi
 Another Century's Episode: R, Ozuma
 Durarara!! 3way standoff, Tom Tanaka
 Dragon Ball Raging Blast 2, Ginyu
 Starry Sky: After Spring, Haru Oshinari
 Samurai Warriors 3: Xtreme Legends, Toshiie Maeda
 The Legend of Heroes: Trails from Zero, Guy Bannings
2011
 Another Century's Episode Portable, Ozma Lee
 Macross Triangle Frontier, Ozuma Lee
 Tales of the World: Radiant Mythology 3, Lloyd Irving
 Rune Factory Oceans, Joe
 Killzone 3, Thomas Cebu Sebuchenko
 Gakuen Hetalia Portable, America
 Rewrite, Sakuya Otori
 Saint Seiya: Sanctuary Battle, Phoenix Ikki
 Assassin's Creed Revelations, Altair Ibn La Ahado
 Initial D Arcade Stage 6 AA, Hideo Minagawa
 Samurai Warriors: Chronicles, Toshiie Maeda
 Samurai Warriors 3: Empires, Toshiie Maeda
 Suto*Mani: Strobe*Mania, Hayato Natsume
 The Legend of Heroes: Trails to Azure, Guy Bannings
 Warriors Orochi 3, Toshiie Maeda, Shuten Douji
2012
 Genso Suikoden: Tsumugareshi Hyakunen no Toki, Ducasse
 Fist of the North Star: Ken's Rage 2, Kenshiro
 Solomon's Ring, Asmodeus
 Initial D Arcade Stage 7 AAX, Hideo Minagawa
 Samurai Warriors: Chronicles 2nd, Toshiie Maeda
2013
 Valhalla Knights 3, Carlos
 Shin Megami Tensei IV, Walter
 Super Robot Wars Operation Extend, Kamina, Ozma Lee
 Metal Max 4: Gekkō no Diva, Lalo
 Gaist Crusher, Borukan
 Warriors Orochi 3 Ultimate, Toshiie Maeda
2014
 J-Stars Victory VS, Kenshiro
Call of Duty: Advanced Warfare, Gideon, Japanese dub
 Samurai Warriors 4, Toshiie Maeda
 Samurai Warriors: Chronicle 3, Toshiie Maeda
2015
Yakuza 0, Jun Oda
 Samurai Warriors 4-II, Naomasa Ii, Toshiie Maeda
 Fire Emblem Fates, Xander
 Initial D Arcade Stage 8 Infinity, Hideo Minagawa
 Bloodborne, Alfred
2016
 The King of Fighters XIV, Maxima
 Gundam Breaker 3, Mr. Gunpla
2017
 Final Fantasy XIV: Stormblood, Hien
 Fire Emblem Heroes, Xander/Marx, Hubert
 Fire Emblem Warriors, Xander/Marx
2018
 Octopath Traveler, Olberic Eisenberg
 Identity V, Thief/Kreacher Pierson
 Dragalia Lost, Ranzal
 Mega Man 11, Torch Man, Rush
 Granblue Fantasy, Hooded Figure/Beelzebub
 Warriors Orochi 4, Naomasa Ii, Toshiie Maeda, Shuten Douji
2019
 Jump Force, Kenshiro
The King of Fighters All Star, Maxima
 The King of Fighters for Girls, Maxima
 Arknights, SilverAsh
 Fire Emblem: Three Houses, Hubert von Vestra
 Ikemen Sengoku: Toki o Kakeru Koi, Motonari Mouri
2021
 Samurai Warriors 5, Toshiie Maeda
 JoJo's Bizarre Adventure: Last Survivor, Diavolo
2022
 The King of Fighters XV, Maxima
 Lost Judgment, Kyoya Sadamoto
 JoJo's Bizarre Adventure: All Star Battle R, Diavolo
 Fitness Boxing: Fist of the North Star, Kenshiro

Dubbing
 Black Adam, Samir (James Cusati-Moyer)
 The Calling, Avraham Avraham (Jeff Wilbusch)
 Coyote Ugly, Kevin O'Donnell (Adam Garcia)
 Euphoria, Fezco (Angus Cloud)
 The Fast and the Furious: Tokyo Drift, Sean Boswell (Lucas Black)
 Final Destination, Billy Hitchcock (Seann William Scott)
 Illegal Tender, Wilson DeLeon Jr. (Rick Gonzalez)
 Jason Bourne (2022 BS Tokyo edition), Craig Jeffers (Ato Essandoh)
 Leonardo, Bernardo Bembo (Flavio Parenti)
 Misconduct, The Accountant (Lee Byung-hun)
 The Nevers, Augustus Bidlow (Tom Riley)
 Night of the Living Dead, Bill Cardille
 Showtime, Lazy Boy (Mos Def)
 Vanguard, Zhang Kaixuan (Ai Lun)

Live-Action Dramas/Movies

Vomics
 Beelzebub, Tatsumi Oga
 Kuroko's Basketball, Taiga Kagami
 Medaka Box, Mahibi Moji

References

External links 

 Ken Production profile 
 
 
 Katsuyuki Konishi at GamePlaza-Haruka Voice Acting Database 
 Katsuyuki Konishi at Hitoshi Doi's Seiyuu Database

1973 births
Japanese male video game actors
Japanese male voice actors
Living people
People from Wakayama (city)
Male voice actors from Wakayama Prefecture
20th-century Japanese male actors
21st-century Japanese male actors
Ken Production voice actors